El Hijo del Pueblo (The People's Son) is the 1975 soundtrack from the film of the same name. It was later released in the United States in 1991 and is the 25th best-selling Latin album in the country.

Track listing
Escuché las Golondrinas
La Primera Caricia
La Ley del Monte
Campanas del Olvido
No Me Hagas Menos
Dejo de Quererme
Hasta la Tumba
La Ley de la Vida
Que Triste Estoy
Le Pese a Quien le Pese
El Hijo del Pueblo

Certifications

See also
List of best-selling Latin albums in the United States

References

1975 soundtrack albums
Spanish-language soundtracks
Vicente Fernández soundtracks